Timo Scheider (born 10 November 1978 in Lahnstein) is a German racing driver who competes in the FIA World Rallycross Championship for Münnich Motorsport. He won the DTM title in 2008 and 2009.

Career

Karting
Like most other drivers, Scheider started his racing career in karting in 1989. In 1992, he went on to win the Kerpen Winter Cup and earned seventh place in the German Junior Kart NRW-Cup a year later. His seventh place disappointment led to success the next year when he won the cup.

Formula Renault
In 1995, Scheider joined the German Formula Renault 1800 championship and won it in his first year. The next year, he jumped to the 2000 championship and earned fourth place.

Formula Three
After only two years in Formula Renault, the German moved to Formula Three in 1997, in the German series. He clinched second place behind Nick Heidfeld in 1997 with three wins but his performance deteriorated the next year when he finished seventh, despite three victories. In 1999 he finished sixth, bringing an end to his rise through the single-seater ranks.

DTM

Scheider spent the next five years of his racing career in DTM for Opel. In his first year in 2000, he finished twelfth followed by a disappointing 19th the next year. He improved to finish eighth in 2002. The following year he finished eighth again and scored a pole position. He also finished in first place at the 24 Hours Nürburgring. In 2004, Scheider retained his eighth place in DTM and was tenth in the 24 Hours of Nürburgring.

GTs
Scheider left the DTM in 2005, which became a busy year for Scheider. He joined Vitaphone Racing in the FIA GT Championship, where he finished second. He won the Spa 24 Hours and also at Istanbul. He was 13th overall and class winner in the Nürburgring 24 Hours. He was also selected for A1 Team Germany that year.

Return to DTM
After one year away, Scheider returned to the DTM in 2006 with Audi Sport Team Rosberg, finishing the season in 10th place. In 2007 he joined the works Audi team, Abt Sportsline, finally taking his first podium finish as he finished seventh overall.

2008 showed great improvement from Scheider winning three races as he won the 2008 DTM Championship, finishing four points ahead of Paul di Resta of Mercedes-Benz. In 2009 he repeated his title success for Audi, beating closest rival Gary Paffett by five points over the ten rounds, taking two victories. He therefore become the only second DTM driver after Bernd Schneider to defend his title.

Retirement from DTM
As of October 2016, Scheider announced his retirement from DTM, effective at the end of the season.

Rallycross
After making sporadic appearances in the 2015 and 2016 FIA World Rallycross Championship for Münnich Motorsport, Scheider signed with MJP Racing Team Austria for a full 2017 campaign. He finished second in the opening round in Barcelona.

Extreme E 
Scheider will make his Extreme E debut in the 2023 season for Carl Cox Motorsport with Christine GZ as his teammate.

Racing record

Complete Deutsche Tourenwagen Masters results
(key) (Races in bold indicate pole position) (Races in italics indicate fastest lap)

1 - Shanghai was a non-championship round.

Complete A1 Grand Prix results
(key)

24 Hours of Le Mans results

Complete FIA World Rallycross Championship results

Supercar/RX1

Complete World Touring Car Cup results
(key) (Races in bold indicate pole position) (Races in italics indicate fastest lap)

References

External links

 Timo Scheider official website

1978 births
Living people
People from Rhein-Lahn-Kreis
Racing drivers from Rhineland-Palatinate
A1 Team Germany drivers
FIA GT Championship drivers
German Formula Three Championship drivers
German racing drivers
Deutsche Tourenwagen Masters drivers
Deutsche Tourenwagen Masters champions
Blancpain Endurance Series drivers
24 Hours of Spa drivers
Motorsport team owners
World Touring Car Cup drivers
Extreme E drivers
World Rallycross Championship drivers
Abt Sportsline drivers
Audi Sport drivers
Josef Kaufmann Racing drivers
A1 Grand Prix drivers
Super Nova Racing drivers
Team Rosberg drivers
Phoenix Racing drivers
Schnitzer Motorsport drivers
AF Corse drivers
W Racing Team drivers
Nürburgring 24 Hours drivers